Peter, Sue and Marc were a Swiss music group from Bern. The members were Peter Reber (born 1949, vocals / piano / guitar), Sue Schell (born 1950 in New York, vocals), and Marc Dietrich (born 1948, vocals / guitar). They represented Switzerland at the Eurovision Song Contest four times, singing in four different languages, French in ESC 1971 with "Les illusions de nos vingt ans", English in 1976 with "Djambo, Djambo", German in 1979 with "Trödler und Co", Italian in 1981 with "Io senza te". They sold over 2 million records in Switzerland. They held concerts in many countries including Germany, Austria, and Japan. Their greatest hit was "Cindy" in 1976 (it was released in South Africa in 1978, where it became a hit, peaking at number 3 on the charts in November of that year). The song "Birds of paradise" became a hit in Slovakia in 2006. Initially the song was played at the funeral of 42 military plane crash victims. Following that people flooded radio stations across the country with requests for this song.

During their career, Peter Sue and Marc made many other attempts to sing at Eurovision. They came third in the 1973 Swiss qualifier with "Es kommt ein Tag". In 1974 they again missed out on a place at the final, this time with the song "Frei". 1975 saw them finish in second place in the Swiss heat with "Lève-toi le soleil". In 1978 they took part in the German finals, and their entry, "Charlie Chaplin", was placed third. In 1987 Marc attempted to represent Switzerland with the song "Nostradamus", finishing second behind Carol Rich.

In addition to his participations alongside Sue and Marc, Peter Reber also composed, co-wrote, and conducted the 1980 Swiss entry, "Cinéma" performed by Paola di Medico. It also makes him one of a handful of performers to have participated at Eurovision as both a performer and conductor.

"The Birds of Paradise" was covered by the Russian singer Dmitry Selivanov in 1987 and released in 1990.

References

Eurovision Song Contest entrants of 1971
Eurovision Song Contest entrants of 1976
Eurovision Song Contest entrants of 1979
Eurovision Song Contest entrants of 1981
Eurovision Song Contest entrants for Switzerland
Swiss pop music groups
1949 births
Living people